Magnus Olsson (born 25 January 1972) is a Swedish former bandy player who most played his entire professional career for Edsbyns IF as a midfielder.

Career

Club career
Olsson is a youth product of Edsbyn and has represented their senior team his entire career from 1987 to 2016. While at Edsbyn, Olsson was a member of their squads that won the Swedish championship in the 2003–04, 2004–05, 2005–06, 2006–07 and 2007–08 seasons. He was also part of the Bandy World Cup winning squad in 2001–02 season.

International career
Olsson was part of Swedish World Champions teams of 1995 and 1997.

Honours

Country
 Sweden
 Bandy World Championship: 1995, 1997

References

External links

1972 births
Living people
Swedish bandy players
Edsbyns IF players
Sweden international bandy players
Bandy World Championship-winning players